Nashorn (German for "rhinoceros"), initially known as Hornisse (German "hornet"), was a German Panzerjäger  ("tank hunter") of World War II. It was developed as an interim solution in 1942 by equipping a light turretless chassis based on the Panzer III and Panzer IV tanks with the 88mm Pak 43 anti-tank gun. Though only lightly armoured and displaying a high profile, it could penetrate the front armour of any Allied tank at long range, and its relatively low cost and superior mobility to heavier vehicles ensured it remained in production until the war's end.

Development

After the first German experiences with the newer Soviet tanks like the T-34  medium tank or the Kliment Voroshilov heavy tank during Operation Barbarossa, the need for a Panzerjäger capable of destroying these more heavily armoured tanks became clear.

In February 1942, the Alkett (Altmärkische Kettenwerke GmbH) arms firm of Berlin designed a tank destroyer using their recently developed Geschützwagen III/IV chassis which, as its name indicated, used components of both the Panzer III and Panzer IV tanks. The 8,8 cm Panzerjägerkanone 43/1 L/71 (PaK 43/1) a long-barreled anti-tank gun ( also used, as the KwK 43, for the main armament of the Tiger II tank) was mounted on the rear of the chassis complete with its gun shield, and an open-topped superstructure was built up around the gun to give the crew some protection. The gun had the same traverse and elevation as if it had been on its carriage: 15° to either side and between -5° to +15° elevation. To accommodate the long and heavy gun, the hull had to be lengthened and the engine moved from the rear to the centre of the chassis. The amount of armour provided for the crew compartment was limited. The shielding provided was adequate to protect the crew from blast and small arms, but not armour-piercing rounds. Thus, like the Marder series, the vehicle was not intended to engage in tank fights, but to provide mobility to a powerful anti-tank gun.

This model was presented for approval to Adolf Hitler in October 1942 and entered production in early 1943. It had numerous official designations, such as 8,8 cm Pak 43 (L/71) auf Fahrgestell Panzerkampfwagen III/IV (Sf) or 8,8cm Pak43 (L/71) auf Geschützwagen III/IV (Sd. Kfz. 164), though it was also known as the Panzerjäger Hornisse (in English "tank-hunter Hornet")

During the first half of 1943, a new model of the Hornisse was introduced into production. This model altered the driver's front armour plate, along with other minor differences. This model and its predecessor, the few early production vehicles, were almost indistinguishable. It was renamed Nashorn by Hitler in 1944.

Total production of the Nashorn amounted to some 494 vehicles, most of which were built in 1943. In January 1944, Hitler favored production of a newer, fully-casemated tank destroyer, the Jagdpanzer IV, which had a much lower silhouette, thicker frontal armor (60 mm frontal plate), and an effective though less powerful 7.5 cm gun. Though still primarily an ambush weapon, this vehicle was better built for armoured engagements. Production of the Nashorn continued into 1945, although at a slow pace.

Combat service

The Hornisse/Nashorn was issued to the heavy anti-tank battalions (Schwere Panzerjäger-Abteilungen), with which six would eventually be equipped: Schwere Panzerjäger Abteilung 560, 655, 525, 93, 519 and 88. Each battalion was equipped with 45 Nashorns. Most of the Nashorns in these units fought either on the Eastern Front or in Italy, few having been sent to Western Europe.

The Nashorn's gun was a variant of the Pak 43, closely related to guns used later for the Ferdinand/Elefant, Tiger II and Jagdpanther. Its tungsten carbide–cored round, the Pzgr. 40/43, was capable of penetrating 190 mm of rolled steel armour at a 30° angle of impact at a distance of 1,000 m. The gun's performance enabled Nashorns to penetrate the front armour plating of any Allied combat vehicle and to engage enemy units while staying out of range themselves, thanks to its combination of excellent gunsights, optics, and accuracy.

The Hornisse/Nashorn made its debut during the Battle of Kursk in 1943, where it performed extremely well. The ability to engage the enemy at long distances negated the disadvantages of its light armour, lack of a roof and a large profile, and revealed that the weapon was well suited to the open and flat steppes that make up much of the landscape of what was then the western Soviet Union. In Italy, however, the generally hilly terrain was not as favourable to the harnessing of the Nashorn's full ability at accurate long-range fire against enemy forces as in Russia.
  
On 6 March 1945, a US Army M26 Pershing heavy tank was knocked out by a Nashorn in the town of Niehl near Cologne, at a close range of under 300 yd (270 m).

 Survivors 
There are two Nashorns on display in military museums: one in the U.S. Army Armor & Cavalry Collection and at the new Patriot Park military museum in Moscow, Russia (it was formerly on display in Kubinka Tank Museum). 

A third privately owned Nashorn is being restored to running condition in the Netherlands. In 2019, this third surviving vehicle suffered severe damage after being caught in an accidental garage fire, with both the transmission system and engine getting the worst of it. The restoration has made this Nashorn operational again.

Armor

Technical data
Tracks: single pin, 400 mm wide
Ground contact length: 3.80 m
Shoes(links)/track: 104
Ground pressure: 0.85 kg/cm²
Obstacle performance
Vertical obstacle: 0.6 m
Trench: 2.3 m
Fording: 0.8 m
Gearbox: synchromesh manual with six forward and one reverse gear
Clutch: Fichtel & Sachs La 120 HDA dry, triple disc
Primary gun sight: Selbstfahrlafetten-Zielfernrohr 1a, 5× magnification and 8° field of view
Indirect fire sight: Aushilfsrichtmittel'' 38, 3x magnification and 10° field of view
Radio: FuG Spr. f

References

External links
 Achtung Panzer!-Nashorn Page
 World War II Vehicles
 Hornisse manual
 Nashorn in Kubinka tank museum
 Armour penetration table of 8.8 cm Pak 43
 Surviving Panzer IV variants - A PDF file presenting the Panzer IV variants (Jagdpanzer IV, Hummel, Nashorn, Brummbär, StuG IV, Flakpanzer tanks and prototypes based on Pz IV) still existing in the world

World War II tank destroyers of Germany
Military vehicles introduced from 1940 to 1944